William Holdsworth (1871–1944) was a legal historian.

William Holdsworth may also refer to:

Bill Holdsworth (William Edgar Newman Holdsworth, 1928–2016), English first-class cricketer
William Holdsworth (politician) (1875–1937), English-born Australian politician

See also 
 Holdsworth (surname)